Mikkel Rakneberg (born 28 February 2002) is a Norwegian footballer who plays as a forward for Kristiansund.

Career
Rakneberg played youth football at Lillestrøm, before starting his senior career with Ull/Kisa in 2021. In January 2022, he signed a four-year contract with Kristiansund. On 3 April 2022, he made his Eliteserien debut in a 1–0 loss against Aalesund.

References

External links

2002 births
Living people
People from Lillestrøm
Association football forwards
Norwegian footballers
Lillestrøm SK players
Ullensaker/Kisa IL players
Kristiansund BK players
Norwegian First Division players
Eliteserien players
Sportspeople from Viken (county)